Till My Heartaches End is a 2010 Filipino romantic drama film directed by Jose Javier Reyes and starring Kim Chiu and Gerald Anderson. It is produced and released by Star Cinema.

Plot
Paolo "Powie" Barredo (Gerald Anderson) is out to prove to the world that he can succeed in life independently, and is not just a son born out of wedlock. Despite a rough upbringing, he climbs the ladder of success. As things start falling into place and he is thrilled to achieve his goal, he puts other life matters on hold.

Agnes Garcia (Kim Chiu) always longed for the time when her family will finally be completed again. At the age 6, her parents left the country to work abroad – her mother was a medical technician in America, while her father worked as an engineer in Riyadh. Despite the distance, Agnes treasured the hope that she would reunite with her parents once again when she passes the nursing exam and applies to work in the States.

They find each other at a café and couldn't take their eyes off each other. They found solace and comfort in each other's company. But their life paths moved them in opposite directions.

Cast

Main

Soundtrack
The official soundtrack, 'Till My Heartaches End, is covered by Carol Banawa, which was originally sung by Ella Mae Saison.

References

External links

2010 films
2010s Tagalog-language films
Star Cinema films
2010 romantic drama films
Philippine romantic drama films
2010s English-language films